Sehdev is a surname. Notable people with the surname include:

Paramdeep Sehdev (born 1971), better known as Bobby Friction, British DJ, television presenter, and radio presenter